Zekeriyaköy is a village of the Sarıyer district of the Istanbul municipality in Turkey. 

It is known for its quiet village life and upper middle class population. It became a rising entity in the real estate market after the construction of the modern villas next to the old village, where natives still live. Fincan, Kudeta and Antilop are some of the popular restaurants in Zekeriyaköy. Zekeriyaköy is the most populated village in Turkey.

The high end residential developments have turned this small village into one of the wealthiest districts of Istanbul. Due to its close location to the city's main financial centers such as Maslak and Levent, it has also become a prime location for the Istanbul business elite in recent years.

Zekeriyaköy is neighbor to Maden, Bahçeköy, Uskumruköy, Demirciköy, and Rumelifeneri and 4.5 km away from Kilyos.

Name
Zekeriyaköy takes its name from the türbe of Zekeriya Baba, which is located behind the historical mosque of the village.

Education

 British International School Istanbul Zekeriyaköy Campus

External links
 Miscellaneous images of Zekeriyaköy, Istanbul

References

Villages in Istanbul Province
Sarıyer